Devudala is a village located in Regidi Amadalavalasa mandal in Srikakulam district, Andhra Pradesh, India.

Villages in Srikakulam district

Devudala total population is about 1496 With sc population of around 362.Geographical area is about 275 hectares .sex ratio is more than Andhra pradesh sex ratio.Literacy rate is about 55.07  percentage which is less than average literacy rate of Andhra Pradesh. Devudala could be the mandal head quarter.it  wasn't due to its geographical location which is 2km away  from the main road.Devudala is having both primary and higher education schools  since 1960 and kasturi ba hostel also there for deprived girls in the society. sbi bank cooperative bank for financial needs for village people . Recently cooperative Bank shifted to  mandal head quarter due to its locational disadvantage.